Armina magna is a species of sea slug, a nudibranch, a marine gastropod mollusk in the family Arminidae.

References

 Gosliner T.M., Behrens D.W. & Valdés A. (2008) Indo-Pacific nudibranchs and sea slugs. Sea Challengers Natural History Books and California Academy of Sciences. 426 pp.
 Gosliner T.M. & Fahey S.J. (2011) Previously undocumented diversity and abundance of cryptic species: a phylogenetic analysis of Indo-Pacific Arminidae Rafinesque, 1814 (Mollusca: Nudibranchia) with descriptions of 20 new species of Dermatobranchus. Zoological Journal of the Linnean Society 161: 245–356.
page(s): 253

Arminidae
Gastropods described in 1955